Senecio nemorensis is a species of perennial plant from the family Asteraceae that can reach  in height. The plant is native to Europe and Asia, where it can be found growing at elevation .

References

nemorensis
Endemic flora of Turkey
Plants described in 1753
Taxa named by Carl Linnaeus